Zhou Xihan (August 27, 1913 – November 7, 1988) was a People's Liberation Army lieutenant general.  He served in the Chinese Workers' and Peasants' Red Army and Eighth Route Army. He fought in the Chinese Civil War and Second Sino-Japanese War.

References

1913 births
1988 deaths
People's Liberation Army generals from Hubei
People from Dawu County, Hubei
Military personnel of the Second Sino-Japanese War
Chiefs of Staff of the People's Liberation Army Navy